San Bernardo (also, Rancho San Bernardo) is a village in Chihuahua, Mexico.

References

Populated places in Chihuahua (state)